Deerfield is a city in Kearny County, Kansas, United States.  As of the 2020 census, the population of the city was 711.

History
The first settlement was made at Deerfield in 1885. Deerfield was incorporated as a city in 1907.

Geography
Deerfield is located at  (37.982081, -101.134848).

Climate
According to the Köppen Climate Classification system, Deerfield has a semi-arid climate, abbreviated "BSk" on climate maps.

Demographics

2010 census
As of the census of 2010, there were 700 people, 235 households, and 180 families residing in the city. The racial makeup of the city was 81.0% White, 1.1% African American, 1.1% Native American, 0.3% Asian, 14.6% from other races, and 1.9% from two or more races. Hispanic or Latino of any race were 48.7% of the population.

There were 235 households, of which 46.4% had children under the age of 18 living with them, 57.0% were married couples living together, 14.9% had a female householder with no husband present, 4.7% had a male householder with no wife present, and 23.4% were non-families. 19.1% of all households were made up of individuals, and 6.8% had someone living alone who was 65 years of age or older. The average household size was 2.98 and the average family size was 3.41.

The median age in the city was 32 years. 31.4% of residents were under the age of 18; 10% were between the ages of 18 and 24; 26.1% were from 25 to 44; 21.1% were from 45 to 64; and 11.6% were 65 years of age or older. The gender makeup of the city was 49.0% male and 51.0% female.

2000 census
As the 2000 census, there were 884 people, 270 households and 221 families residing in the city. The racial makeup of the city was 65.27% White, 0.34% African American, 0.23% Native American, 0.45% Pacific Islander, 30.54% from other races, and 3.17% from two or more races. Hispanic or Latino of any race were 51.58% of the population.

There were 270 households, of which 50.0% had children under the age of 18 living with them, 65.2% were married couples living together, 10.7% had a female householder with no husband present, and 17.8% were non-families. 16.3% of all households were made up of individuals, and 5.6% had someone living alone who was 65 years of age or older. The average household size was 3.27 and the average family size was 3.66.

39.1% of the population were under the age of 18, 8.4% from 18 to 24, 26.8% from 25 to 44, 17.4% from 45 to 64, and 8.3% who were 65 years of age or older. The median age was 27 years. For every 100 females, there were 114.0 males. For every 100 females age 18 and over, there were 102.3 males.

The median household income was $31,944 and the median family income was $36,111. Males had a median income of $23,182 compared with $18,667 for females. The per capita income for the city was $12,802. About 11.8% of families and 14.5% of the population were below the poverty line, including 14.1% of those under age 18 and 7.7% of those age 65 or over.

Education
The community is served by Deerfield USD 216 public school district.

See also
 Santa Fe Trail

References

Further reading

External links

 City of Deerfield
 Deerfield - Directory of Public Officials
 USD 216, local school district
 Deerfield City Map, KDOT

Cities in Kansas
Cities in Kearny County, Kansas
Kansas populated places on the Arkansas River